Cheryl Deserée Vaimoso-Adams (born March 4, 1982) is an American singer-songwriter and model of Samoan, English, and Irish descent. She is based in Nashville, Tennessee.

Early life
Deserée was raised in San Jacinto and Hemet, California. She attended San Jacinto High School.

Career
Deserée released her self-titled debut album Cheryl Deserée on February 9, 2016. The album includes all original material. On December 1, 2017, she released a Christmas single entitled Warm in December. Deserée's second album Dreamy was released on September 7, 2018.

In March 2018, Cheryl Deserée was awarded "Western Swing Female of the Year", by Texas-based organization, The Academy of Western Artists. She is also nominated for "Western Swing Female of the Year" for the 2019 Ameripolitan Awards.

Discography

Albums
 Cheryl Deserée (2016)
 Dreamy (2018)

Singles
 Warm in December (2017)

References

External links
 Official Website

1982 births
Living people
American people of Samoan descent
American people of English descent
American people of Irish descent
American women country singers
American country singer-songwriters
Singer-songwriters from California
21st-century American singers
21st-century American women singers
Country musicians from California